Peter Jason Quill, also known by his alias Star-Lord, is a fictional character portrayed primarily by Chris Pratt in the Marvel Cinematic Universe (MCU) media franchise, based on the Marvel Comics character of the same name. Quill is initially depicted as a member of the space mercenary group called the Ravagers who was abducted from Earth as a child by Yondu Udonta. He becomes the leader of the Guardians of the Galaxy after they assemble out of necessity to stop Ronan the Accuser from destroying Xandar. He discovers that he is a Celestial hybrid and that his father Ego created him (and numerous half-siblings) as a means to terraform planets. With the help of his half-sister Mantis, Quill and the Guardians defeat Ego, and he develops a romantic relationship with Gamora. When Thanos begins his hunt for the Infinity Stones, Quill participates in the battle against him and learns Thanos killed Gamora. Quill is a victim of the Blip, but is resurrected by the Avengers and joins in on the final battle against Thanos where he meets an alternate 2014-Gamora who does not know him. After Thanos is defeated, Quill and the Guardians depart for space with Thor Odinson.

, Quill has appeared in five films and the television special The Guardians of the Galaxy Holiday Special (2022), and will return in the upcoming film Guardians of the Galaxy Volume 3 (2023). The character and Pratt's portrayal have been met with positive reception.

Alternate versions of Quill from within the MCU multiverse appear in Avengers: Endgame (2019), portrayed by Pratt, and in the animated series What If...? (2021), voiced by Brian T. Delaney.

Concept and creation
The comic book character first appeared in the black-and-white magazine publication Marvel Preview #4 (Jan 1976). Creator Steve Englehart established the character as "an unpleasant, introverted jerk" who was intended to evolve into "the most cosmic being in the universe", but this development went unrealized after Englehart left Marvel. Star-Lord continued to appear in Marvel Preview, with writer Chris Claremont revamping the character and using science fiction adventure stories like the Heinlein juveniles for inspiration. Star-Lord made sporadic appearances over the next few years in various titles, with the character playing a central role in the "Annihilation: Conquest" crossover storyline, and the second volume of the 2008 run of Guardians of the Galaxy, featuring a team led by Star-Lord for the duration of the title's 25-issue run.

Marvel Studios President Kevin Feige first mentioned Guardians of the Galaxy as a potential film at the 2010 San Diego Comic-Con International, stating, "There are some obscure titles, too, like Guardians of the Galaxy. I think they've been revamped recently in a fun way in the [comic] book." Feige reiterated that sentiment in a September 2011 issue of Entertainment Weekly, saying, "There's an opportunity to do a big space epic, which Thor sort of hints at, in the cosmic side" of the Marvel Cinematic Universe. Feige added, should the film be made, it would feature an ensemble of characters, similar to X-Men and The Avengers. Feige announced that the film was in active development at the 2012 San Diego Comic-Con International during the Marvel Studios panel, with an intended release date of August 1, 2014. He said the film's titular team would consist of the characters Star-Lord, Drax the Destroyer, Gamora, Groot, and Rocket.

Fictional character biography

Origin 
Peter Quill was born in 1980. His father was the Celestial Ego (a fact of which Quill does not become aware until later in life), while his mother, Meredith, was a human from Missouri. As a child in 1988, Quill watches as his mother is dying from cancer. Unable to deal with it, he runs away and is abducted by the extraterrestrial spaceship of a mercenary gang called the Ravagers, led by Yondu Udonta. Although Yondu has been hired to deliver Quill to Ego, being aware of Ego's monstrous intentions, he instead keeps the boy and raises him as a surrogate son. Due to his own harsh upbringing, Yondu is stern with Quill, but also affectionate. At one point, he scoffs at a young Quill's attempt to celebrate Christmas, destroying his Christmas tree and throwing away his gifts, but later relents and opens the gift Quill gave him, gifting Quill a set of blasters in return.

Creating the Guardians of the Galaxy 

26 years later, an adult Quill is a member of the Ravagers, and has had many adventures around the galaxy. While on a scavenging job, Quill finds himself embroiled in a significant power struggle and revenge war between two advanced galactic powers, the Kree warlord Ronan the Accuser and Xandar's Nova Corps, while also being hunted by Yondu after failing to bring him a stolen relic he found on Morag (later revealed to be an Infinity Stone).

After he successfully retrieves the Power Stone, he returns to Xandar, where he is confronted by Gamora, who attempts to steal the Stone for herself, and Rocket and Groot, who attempt to capture Quill to collect a bounty on him. After a fight breaks out, the four are sent to a Nova Corps prison called the Kyln. They break out with another cellmate named Drax the Destroyer and escape on Quill's spaceship, where they become the Guardians of the Galaxy. Gamora takes them to Knowhere, where the Collector explains the significance of the Infinity Stones. However, they are attacked by Ronan's forces and forced to flee, losing the Power Stone in the process. Learning that Ronan plans to use the Power Stone to completely destroy Xandar, they travel there to stop him, with the help of Yondu and the Ravagers. After a battle between Ronan's army and the Nova Corps, the Guardians manage to destroy Ronan's warship. Quill initiates a dance-off to distract Ronan while the others blast Ronan's axe to free the Power Stone, which they are able to use to disintegrate Ronan. In the end, Quill and the Guardians are hailed as heroes as he vows to keep an eye on the team in case they break any laws again. Throughout the film, Quill is shown listening to a mixtape of various hit songs from 1962 – 1986 in a Walkman that was given to him by his mother, which serves as his only connection with Earth.

Meeting Ego 

A few months later, Quill and the Guardians are hired by the Sovereign to fight off an alien attacking their valuable batteries, in exchange for Nebula. After learning that Rocket stole some of the Sovereign's batteries, which causes their war fleet to attack, they crash land on a planet, where Quill meets his father, Ego, a primordial Celestial who manifests a human avatar that allows him to interact with other races. Quill, Gamora, and Drax go with Ego to his planet where they meet his ward Mantis. Ego informs Quill that he too possesses his Celestial abilities. Quill is initially happy to have found his father and to have family again, however, it is eventually revealed that Ego intends to terraform all other planets into extensions of himself, killing all other life, and had conceived Quill with the intention that his son would provide the extra power necessary to do so. After Ego reveals that he killed his mother, Quill turns against him. Quill keeps Ego occupied in combat with his newfound Celestial powers until Baby Groot places a bomb on Ego's brain. After Ego dies and Quill loses his Celestial powers, he is rescued from the planet's destruction by Yondu, who reveals himself as an adopted father to Quill. In space, Yondu gives Quill the last space suit, sacrificing his life to save him. The Guardians hold a memorial and give Yondu an honorable funeral, as the Ravagers arrive to pay homage. Quill also replaces his Walkman, which Ego had destroyed, with a Zune.

Infinity War and Resurrection 

Four years later, Quill and the Guardians respond to a distress signal and end up rescuing Thor, who is floating in space amidst the wreckage of the Statesman. Thor informs them that Thanos has begun his quest for the six Infinity Stones. with the Power Stone and Space Stone already in his possession. Quill takes Gamora, with whom he is now in a romantic relationship, to Knowhere, accompanied by Drax and Mantis. On the way, Gamora makes him promise to kill her if Thanos ever captures her, to prevent him from learning the Soul Stone's location which she knows. On Knowhere, however, Gamora is captured by Thanos, but Quill fails to kill her as he had promised, because of Thanos’ use of the Reality Stone as he leaves with Gamora. Quill, Drax, and Mantis travel to Titan and meet Tony Stark, Stephen Strange, and Peter Parker, in a brief confrontation in which they realize they are on the same side. They fight Thanos when he arrives and gain the upper hand, with Mantis subduing him with her powers, until Quill learns of Gamora's death from Nebula and grievously attacks Thanos, breaking Mantis' hold. Thanos is then able to obtain the Time Stone from Strange and depart Titan to finish assembling the Infinity Gauntlet. When Thanos snaps his fingers, Quill, along with Drax, Mantis, Parker, and Strange, fall victim to the Blip.

Five years later, Quill is restored to life and is brought through a portal to upstate New York, where he participates in the final battle against an alternate 2014 version of Thanos. There, Quill meets an alternate 2014 Gamora, who (due to not having the memories of her deceased counterpart) rejects his affection. After Tony Stark sacrifices his life to defeat Thanos and his army, Quill is one of the attendees of Stark's funeral. He is then shown to be searching for the alternate 2014 Gamora. Quill leaves Earth with Thor and the restored Guardians, who suggest that he should fight Thor for the honor of leadership, a suggestion that both he and Thor jokingly dismiss. Alongside Thor and Kraglin, the Guardians went on to answer various distress calls across the galaxy.

Aftermath

In 2024, the Guardians respond to a signal from a tribe of Indigarrians, which had been attacked by Habooksa the Horrible and a Booskan army. Severely outmatched, the Guardians enlist the help of Thor, who had been busy meditating. Quill cheers on Thor as the latter joins the fight, easily besting the Booskan army but destroying the Indigarrians’s sacred temple in the process. The Guardians later set off to answer more distress calls as a result of Gorr's rampage across the galaxy, though Thor decided against joining them in order to assist his friend Sif, with Quill giving Thor words of advice before they part ways.

By 2025, the Guardians have bought Knowhere from the Collector, but Quill remains depressed about losing Gamora. At Christmastime, Mantis and Drax try to cheer him by kidnapping the actor, Kevin Bacon, and giving him to Quill as a gift. Quill makes them free Bacon, who then decides to stay and help the Guardians celebrate Christmas. Afterwards, Mantis reveals that she is Quill's half-sister, which brings Quill joy.

Alternate versions

2014 variant 

An alternate variant of Quill from the events of Guardians of the Galaxy appears in Avengers: Endgame.

Time Heist 
In an alternate 2014, Quill arrives on Morag to take the Power Stone but is knocked out by Nebula and James Rhodes, who came from the prime timeline.

What If...?

Several alternate versions of Quill appear in the animated series What If...?, in which he is voiced by Brian T. Delaney.

Life on Earth 

In an alternate 1988, the Ravagers members Kraglin and Taserface mistakenly abduct T'Challa instead of Quill much to the dismay of Yondu. As a result, Quill spends the next twenty years living a normal life on Earth in Missouri. In 2008 while working as a Dairy Queen janitor, he is found by Ego who introduces himself as his father as the episode ends.

Ego begins to drain Quill's Celestial powers and terraform the universe. He is then saved by T'Challa, who destroys Ego's physical body before he is recruited by the Watcher to the Guardians of the Multiverse. Following the defeat of Ultron, T'Challa teaches Quill how to fire a blaster.

Ultron's conquest 

In an alternate 2015, Quill, along with the other Guardians of the Galaxy, are killed by Ultron when defending the Sovereign.

Characterization
Quill is introduced in Guardians of the Galaxy as the half-human, half-alien leader of the Guardians who was abducted from Missouri as a child in 1988 and raised by a group of alien thieves and smugglers called the Ravagers. Pratt was cast in the role in February 2013, as part of a multi-film deal that he signed with Marvel. About the character, Pratt said, "He had a hard time as a kid, and now he goes around space, making out with hot alien girls and just being a rogue and a bit of a jerk, and through teaming up with these guys, finds a higher purpose for himself." He also added that the character is a mix of Han Solo and Marty McFly. Pratt, who was mostly known for playing supporting characters, including Andy Dwyer on the television series Parks and Recreation, initially turned down the role. Pratt had lost weight to portray fit characters in films such as Moneyball and Zero Dark Thirty, and had given up ambitions to play the lead role in action films after humbling auditions for Star Trek and Avatar. Casting director Sarah Finn suggested Pratt to Gunn, who dismissed the idea despite struggling to cast that role. Despite this, Finn arranged for a meeting between the two, at which point Gunn was immediately convinced that Pratt was perfect for the role. Pratt also won over Feige, despite having gained weight again for Delivery Man. Prior to filming, Pratt underwent a strict diet and training regimen to lose  in six months. Pratt signed a multi-film contract with Marvel, and was granted a temporary leave from his work on Parks and Recreation to accommodate his participation in the film. Wyatt Oleff portrayed a young Quill in this film, and again in Guardians of the Galaxy Vol. 2.

In Guardians of the Galaxy Vol. 2, Pratt said that Quill is now famous throughout "the galaxy for having saved so many people... He feels like he's part of this group, a leader of this group. He's a little more responsible and trying to stay out of trouble, but not necessarily doing the best job." Pratt stated that working on the film forced him to come to terms with the death of his own father. Pratt described his role in his next appearance, in Avengers: Infinity War, as a "guest star" appearance and said "you get to be a little more vibrant; a little more irreverent; a little bit more colorful if you want it to be".

Pratt said that Thor: Love and Thunder would continue the rivalry between Quill and Thor that was established in Infinity War and Endgame.

Reception 

In a 2014 review for the first Guardians of the Galaxy, Scott Foundas of Variety said, "James Gunn's presumptive franchise-starter is overlong, overstuffed, and sometimes too eager to please, but the cheeky comic tone keeps things buoyant—as does Chris Pratt's winning performance".

Awards and nominations

See also 
 Characters of the Marvel Cinematic Universe

Notes

References

External links
 Peter Quill on the Marvel Cinematic Universe Wiki
 
 Peter Quill on Marvel.com

Adoptee characters in films
Avengers (film series)
Fictional characters displaced in time
Fictional characters from Missouri
Fictional characters with energy-manipulation abilities
Fictional characters with superhuman durability or invulnerability
Fictional demigods
Fictional extraterrestrial–human hybrids
Fictional gunfighters in films
Fictional mercenaries
Fictional outlaws
Fictional prison escapees
Fictional space pilots
Fictional thieves
Film characters introduced in 2014
Guardians of the Galaxy (film series)
Guardians of the Galaxy characters
Male characters in film
Marvel Cinematic Universe characters
Marvel Comics American superheroes
Marvel Comics extraterrestrial superheroes
Marvel Comics hybrids
Marvel Comics male superheroes
Marvel Comics orphans
Orphan characters in film
Space pirates
Superheroes who are adopted